Andy Pengelly (born 19 July 1997) is an Australian professional footballer who plays as a striker for Lions FC in the National Premier Leagues.

Club career

Brisbane Strikers
In 2019, Pengelly won the National Premier Leagues Queensland Golden Boot, scoring 41 goals in 26 NPL appearances for Brisbane Strikers, including a club record nine in a single match against Sunshine Coast Fire. He also scored 11 goals in eight FFA Cup appearances, including six in a Round 4 Preliminary clash against Souths United. He scored against A-League side Wellington Phoenix in the Round of 32, helping his side to a penalty shootout win, and against Melbourne City in a 5–1 semi final loss, lifting his season tally to 52 goals in just 34 appearances.

As a result of his scoring record, Pengelly trialled with the Central Coast Mariners in August 2019. That trial did not result in a contract.

Lion City Sailors 
Pengelly signed his first professional contract with Singapore Premier League club Home United in December 2019.  Prior to the start of the 2020 season, the club was taken over and its name changed to Lion City Sailors. Pengelly scored on his competitive debut for the Sailors in their 1–1 away draw with Tanjong Pagar United on Friday, 6 March 2020, in what was the club's' first ever goal as the Sailors.

On 15 July 2020, it was announced Pengelly had parted ways with the club to remain in Australia, where he had returned during the global COVID-19 pandemic, to sign for NPL side Peninsula Power.

Peninsula Power 
Pengelly signed for Peninsula Power from the Brisbane Strikers, but left for Singapore to play for Lion City Sailors before he kicked a ball for the Redcliffe peninsula-based club.

His first game for the Power came after he returned to Queensland during the COVID-19 pandemic, joining the side late in the 2020 season. He scored 14 goals in 15 league games that year.

In his first full season, in 2021, Pengelly scored 30 goals in 27 league appearances for the Power, taking out the NPL Queensland Golden Boot and the competition's Player of the Year award.

Lions FC 
On December 23, 2021, Lions FC announced Pengelly as their number 9 for the 2022 NPL Queensland season.

Career statistics

Club

Notes

Honours 
Brisbane Strikers
 NPL Queensland: Golden Boot (2019)
Peninsula Power

 NPL Queensland: Premiers (2020, 2021)
NPL Queensland: Golden Boot (2021)
NPL Queensland: Player of the Year (2021)
Lions FC

 NPL Queensland: Premiers (2022)

References 

Living people
1997 births
Association football forwards
Australian soccer players
Brisbane Strikers FC players
National Premier Leagues players
Singapore Premier League players
Lion City Sailors FC players